Khorrambid County is in Fars province, Iran. The capital of the county is the city of Safashahr. At the 2006 census, the county's population was 44,669 in 31,291 households. The following census in 2011 counted 50,252 people in 13,561 households. At the 2016 census, the county's population was 50,522 in 15,080 households.

Administrative divisions

The population history of Khorrambid County's administrative divisions over three consecutive censuses is shown in the following table. The latest census shows two districts, three rural districts, and two cities.

References

 

Counties of Fars Province